Diplolaena andrewsii, is a species of flowering plant in the family Rutaceae and is endemic to the west coast of Western Australia.

Description
The inner bracts are marginally longer than outer bracts, broadly egg-shaped to narrowly oblong, reddish-brown with white edges and smooth on the outer side. The petals are more or less equal in length to inner bracts, smooth or with small hairs. Flowering occurs from July to September.

Taxonomy
This species was first formally described in 1921 by Carl Hansen Ostenfeld and the description was published in Biologiske Meddelelser, the journal of The Royal Danish Academy of Sciences and Letters.

Distribution and habitat
This species in found in the Darling Range near Perth, Western Australia growing in granite rocks in woodland.

References

Sapindales of Australia
Rosids of Western Australia
Plants described in 1921
Taxa named by Carl Hansen Ostenfeld
Zanthoxyloideae